Céline Herbin (born 30 October 1982) is a French professional golfer.

Herbin started playing golf at the age of 15 1/2 and studied one year at Bucknell University as an exchange student. She turned professional in 2009 and qualified for the LPGA Tour on her first attempt in 2015.

Amateur wins
2004 Georgetown Invitational

Professional wins

Ladies European Tour wins (2)

Ladies European Tour playoff record (1–1)

Results in LPGA majors
Results not in chronological order before 2022.

CUT = missed the half-way cut
NT = no tournament
"T" = tied

Team appearances
Professional
European Championships (representing France): 2018

References

External links

French female golfers
Ladies European Tour golfers
LPGA Tour golfers
Bucknell Bison women's golfers
Sportspeople from Manche
1982 births
Living people
21st-century French women